The 1988–89 Providence Friars men's basketball team represented the Providence College during the 1988–89 NCAA Division I men's basketball season. Led by first-year head coach Rick Barnes, the Friars finished the season 18–11 (7–9 Big East) and received an at-large bid to the NCAA tournament as the 12-seed in the Southeast region.

Roster

Schedule and results

|-
!colspan=12 style=| Non-conference Regular Season

|-
!colspan=12 style=| Big East Regular Season

|-
!colspan=12 style=| Big East Tournament

|-
!colspan=12 style=| NCAA Tournament

Rankings

References

Providence Friars men's basketball seasons
Providence
Providence